Roald Als (born April 2, 1948) is a Danish cartoonist best known for his editorial cartoons in the Danish newspapers Weekendavisen and Politiken.

Biography
Roald Als was born in Frederiksberg, Denmark on April 2, 1948. His first published cartoon appeared in the national newspaper Politiken in 1968.

During the 1970s, Als' political cartoons appeared in Hovedbladet, Politisk Revy, Ugebladet København, Levende Billeder among other liberal-oriented publications. Als said, in Danish, "The newspapers always supported a proper salary for the working class, so it was actually strange that one always worked for them for free."

Als was employed at the Danish weekly newspaper Weekendavisen from 1980 to 1994. When his former boss at Weekendavisen became editor of the daily newspaper Politiken, Als moved with him. Als has been employed with Politiken from 1994 to the present, where his drawings are known for the accuracy of their details. Als has also illustrated books and written cookbooks.

Als was married the first time with Eliza Fonnesbach-Sandberg in 1970. He married Annette Margethe Rasmussen in 1990.

Awards
Als has been the recipient of several awards and grants including the Alfred Schmidt Grant (1982), The Danish Ministry of Culture Illustrator Award (1988), The Danish Ministry of Culture Initiative Award (1988), Kai Svarre's Grant (1992), Danish Illustrator of the Year (1996), the Carsten Nielsen Grant (1998), the Victor Award (2001), the Danish Confederation of Trade Unions Culture Award (2003) and the Danish National Press Club Award (2008).

Bibliography 
 En spøjs fætter (1986)
 Kvinderne ud af køkkenet! (1988)
 Personlig tog jeg ikke skade af at vokse op (1995)
 Fodfejl og pletskud (1997) cowritten with Poul Einer Hansen
 De tre Bukke Bruse (1998)
 Håbløst bagud (1999) cowritten with Poul Einer Hansen
 Med ved bordet (2000) cowritten with Poul Einer Hansen
 Vin og vrøvl(2002)
 Frit valg på nederste hylde (2002)
 Fyringsrunde (2004)
 Fru Larsen (2006)
 Politisk korrekt
 Under gulvtæppet
 En god Socialdemokrat (2008)

References

External links
 Politiken.dk - Roald Als

Danish cartoonists
20th-century Danish illustrators
21st-century Danish illustrators
Danish editorial cartoonists
1948 births
Living people
People from Frederiksberg
Politiken people